Midge Bosworth (born 23 June 1941) is a former Australian racing driver.

Bosworth raced in the 1960s and is most remembered for winning the 1965 Bathurst 500, co-driving with Barry Seton in a Fairfield Motors entered Ford Cortina GT500. It was Bosworth's second, and last, start in the Bathurst 500, giving him the distinction along with Harry Firth (1967) and Graeme Bailey (1986), of winning the event in his last drive at Mount Panorama.

Bosworth was only 24 when he won Bathurst in 1965. He held the honour of being the youngest driver to win the race for no less than 31 years, until Craig Lowndes won the 1996 AMP Bathurst 1000 in a Holden Commodore (VR) when he was 22.

Notes

Australian racing drivers
1941 births
Living people
Bathurst 1000 winners